A ripsaw is a wood saw that is specially designed for making a rip cut, a cut made parallel to the direction of the wood grain.

Ripsaw may also refer to:

 Ripsaw music, music made using a hand saw
 Ripsaw (newspaper), a former Duluth, Minnesota newspaper
 Ripsaw (vehicle), a series of developmental unmanned ground combat vehicles
 Ripsaw (Alton Towers), a defunct theme park ride
 Ripsaw catfish, a species of thorny catfish